"Light My Fire" is Kotoko's 17th single released on November 16, 2011, under Warner Home Video. The A-side of the single was used as the opening of Shakugan no Shana Final. "Light My Fire" was written and composed by Ryo of Supercell.

Track listing

References

2011 singles
2011 songs
Kotoko (singer) songs
Shakugan no Shana songs